Nikita Bobchenok (born 4 September 1999) is a Belarusian professional footballer who plays for Orsha.

References

External links 
 
 

1999 births
Living people
Belarusian footballers
Association football midfielders
FC Dnepr Mogilev players
FC Dnyapro Mogilev players
FC Orsha players